Chang Fu-mei (born 10 October 1938) is a Taiwanese politician. She served as the Minister of the Overseas Chinese Affairs Commission, subsequently Overseas Compatriot Affairs Commission of the Executive Yuan in 2000–2008.

Early life
During her doctoral degree study in the United States, she was engaged in academic research in various prestigious institutions there. Her studies immersed her in the Occidental legal system and Roman law, enabling her to fully appreciate the merit of democracy.

Chang moved to the United States after witnessing her close friends being defamed and incarcerated after the Kaohsiung Incident. She searched all of the possible avenues in the US government and a slew of academic institutions.

Early political life
She took up a role in the National Assembly, became executive director of the Commission for Examining Petitions and Appeal of the Taipei City Government and became the watchdog member of Control Yuan.

Overseas Chinese Affairs Commission Minister

United States visit
Chang, as the Minister of Overseas Chinese Affairs Commission, visited United States in 16–17 April 2003 where she was accompanied by Director-General of Taipei Economic and Cultural Office in Chicago. They met with the members of TAAMN, University of Minnesota Taiwan Student Association (TSA) and other Taiwan-related organizations histed by TAAMN and TSA. The next day, they met with Governor of Minnesota Tim Pawlenty and other officials.

References

1938 births
Living people
Harvard University alumni
Taiwanese Members of the Control Yuan
Women government ministers of Taiwan
Government ministers of Taiwan